Grevillea uniformis is a shrub of the genus Grevillea native to a small area along the west coast in the Wheatbelt region of Western Australia.

Description
It blooms between July and November and produces an axillary or terminal raceme regular inflorescence with white or cream flowers with white or cream styles.

Taxonomy
The species was first formally described as Grevillea acrobotrya subsp. uniformis by Donald MacGillivray in 1986. It was reclassified under the current name by the botanists Peter M. Olde and Neil R. Marriott, in 1993 as a part of the work New species and taxonomic changes in Grevillea (Proteaceae: Grevilleoideae) from south-west Western Australia as published in the journal Nuytsia.

Distribution
The plant has a limited distribution in the Mid West and north western Wheatbelt regions from north of Eneabba in the north to Green Head in the west to Badgingarra in the south east. It is commonly found along creeklines and on and around sandstone outcrops growing in sandy to sandy-loamy soils on sandstone or in lateritic gravel as a part of scrubland communities.

See also
 List of Grevillea species

References

uniformis
Proteales of Australia
Eudicots of Western Australia
Taxa named by Donald McGillivray
Plants described in 1986